Yūtarō is a common Japanese given name for males.

Possible writings
Yūtarō can be written using different combinations of kanji characters. Here are some examples: 

The characters used for "taro" (太郎) literally means "thick (big) son" and usually used as a suffix to a masculine name, especially for the first son. The "yu" part of the name can use a variety of characters, each of which will change the meaning of the name ("勇" for bravery, "優" for kindness, "悠" and so on).

勇太郎, "bravery, big son"
友太郎, "friend, big son"
優太郎, "kindness, big son"
雄太郎, "male, big son"
悠太郎, "calm, big son"
裕太郎, "abundant, big son"

Other combinations...

勇太朗, "bravery, thick, bright"
勇多朗, "bravery, many, bright"
勇汰朗, "bravery, excessive, bright"
雄太朗, "male, thick, bright"
悠太朗, "calm, thick, bright"

The name can also be written in hiragana ゆうたろう or katakana ユウタロウ.

Notable people with the name

, Japanese footballer for Gainare Tottori
, Japanese football player
, Japanese footballer for Sanfrecce Hiroshima
, Japanese professional footballer
, Japanese baseball player
, Japanese football player 
, Japanese singer-songwriter 
, Japanese footballer
, Japanese baseball player
, Japanese football player
, Japanese baseball player
, Japanese football player 
, Japanese footballer
, Japanese baseball player
, Japanese footballer

Fictional characters
, a character in Rurouni Kenshin manga and anime.
, a character in Haikyu!! with the position of middle blocker from Aoba Johsai High

Japanese masculine given names